FZD may refer to:
 Firozabad railway station, in Uttar Pradesh, India
 Forschungszentrum Dresden-Rossendorf
 Frizzled, a protein family